Tollcross may refer to the following places:

Tollcross, Edinburgh, Scotland
Tollcross Primary School
Tollcross United F.C. a former football club
Tollcross, Glasgow, Scotland
Tollcross railway station (closed)
Tollcross International Swimming Centre

See also
 Toll (fee), a fee charged for the use of a road or waterway